Soul on the Rocks is the fifth studio album by The Isley Brothers. It was released on the Tamla (Motown) label on January 24, 1967. Their second and final album with the Detroit label, the brothers soon felt disenchanted with their stay at Motown while established groups like The Temptations and The Four Tops, whose styles were more polished than the Isleys, got more promotion. One of the album's tracks, "Behind a Painted Smile" found chart success and made them popular in the United Kingdom, as the Isleys found out on a tour of the country during this period. Motivated, they eventually left Motown and re-formed their T-Neck record label.

Track listing

References

External links
 The Isley Brothers - Soul on the Rocks (1967) album releases & credits at Discogs
 The Isley Brothers - Soul on the Rocks (1967) album to be listened as stream on Spotify

1967 albums
Motown albums
The Isley Brothers albums
Albums produced by Norman Whitfield
Albums produced by Ivy Jo Hunter
Albums produced by Smokey Robinson
Albums recorded at Hitsville U.S.A.